Janne Ijäs (born August 2, 1972) is a Finnish former professional ice hockey centre.

Ijäs played eleven games in the SM-liiga for HPK and scored one assist. He also spent six seasons in France playing for Brest Albatros Hockey.

Career statistics

References

External links

1972 births
Living people
Brest Albatros Hockey players
Finnish ice hockey centres
FoPS players
HPK players
Finnish expatriate ice hockey players in France
People from Hämeenlinna
Sportspeople from Kanta-Häme